Backburner is a Canadian underground hip hop group and musical collective, formed by frequent collaborators Fresh Kils, Uncle Fester, Dexter Doolittle, and Process in Halifax, Nova Scotia in 2001. Their name comes from their habit of starting new projects and leaving others on the back burner. 

The crew has released three official, commercially available albums: Heatwave in 2011, Eclipse in 2015, and Continuum in 2022. A music video was produced for the lead single from Heatwave.

Discography
Albums
 Big Talk (2001)
 Heatwave (2011)
 Eclipse (2015)
 Continuum (2022)

EPs
 Heatwave Remixes (2012)

References

External links
Backburner on Bandcamp
Backburner on Twitter
Backburner on Discogs

Canadian hip hop groups
Musical groups established in 2001